Stanisław Moniuszko (May 5, 1819 – June 4, 1872) was a Polish composer, conductor and teacher. He wrote many popular art songs and operas, and his music is filled with patriotic folk themes of the peoples of the former Polish–Lithuanian Commonwealth (mainly Poles, Lithuanians and Belarusians). He is generally referred to as "the father of Polish national opera". Lithuanians stress, that Stanisław Moniuszko was eagerly using Lithuanian motifs – e.g. his cantatas "Milda", "Nijolė", based on Lithuanian mythology, were issued in Vilnius. Since the 1990s Stanisław Moniuszko is being recognized in Belarus as an important figure of Belarusian culture as well.

Life 
Moniuszko was born into a noble landowning family in Ubiel, Minsk Governorate (now Belarus). His first piano teacher was his mother. He later continued his musical education in Warsaw and Minsk, and studied under Carl Friedrich Rungenhagen in Berlin. In 1858 he was appointed conductor at the Warsaw Opera. He also served as a professor at the Warsaw Conservatory. He died in Warsaw, Congress Poland and was buried at Powązki Cemetery.

Works 
For a complete list, see List of compositions by Stanisław Moniuszko

Moniuszko composed more than 300 individual songs, primarily to texts of Polish poets, and around two dozen operas. His series of twelve song books is notable and contains songs to the words of Adam Mickiewicz, Antoni Edward Odyniec,  Józef Ignacy Kraszewski, Stefan Witwicki, Antoni Malczewski, and Wincenty Pol.

Moniuszko noted that his songs, which were published under the collective title Śpiewnik Domowy (Domestic Songs), had a national character. Their 'Polishness' is found in his use of and reference to traditional Polish dance rhythms like Polonaise, Mazurka, Kujawiak, and Krakowiak and the propagation of texts written by Polish national poets. The songs were often performed by the 19th-century Polish choirs in Austria, Germany, and Russia, and became a point of reference for other Polish composers. 
Moniuszko's opera style bears similarities to that of Daniel Auber and Gioachino Rossini, but with stronger emphasis on chorus and melodies inspired by Polish dances.

Halka is an opera to a libretto written by Włodzimierz Wolski, a young Warsaw poet with radical social views.  After being staged in Warsaw in 1858, it became the most widely known Polish opera and is part of the canon of Polish national operas.

Modern performances 
An English version of Straszny dwór (The Haunted Manor, or The Haunted Castle) was created and premiered by the student operatic society at Bristol University in 1970; this version has been performed since, specifically in 2001 by Opera South, which company also presented the world premiere of a specially created new English version of Verbum Nobile in 2002.

In 2008, Pocket Opera, of San Francisco, CA, USA, premiered Artistic Director Donald Pippin's English language translation of The Haunted Manor.

Moniuszko's opera Flis (The Raftsman) was performed and recorded in the Grand Theatre of Polish National Opera at the 2019 Chopin and his Europe International Music Festival, marking the 200th anniversary of Moniuszko's birth.

Paria was performed at Poznań Opera in June 2019, directed by Graham Vick and conducted by Gabriel Chmura.

Moniuszko's operas are regularly performed at the Belarusian National Opera.

Notes

References

External links 

 
 
 List of works, lieder.net
 "Stanisław Moniuszko", biography, list of works, Polish Music Center, University of Southern California
 How Family Shaped the Father of Polish Opera
 The Lesser Known Faces of Stanisław Moniuszko
 Sound examples and discussion of String Quartet No. 1 and No. 2, editionsilvertrust.com
 Collection of works by Stanisław Moniuszko in National Digital Library of Poland (Polona)
 Stanislaw Moniuszko. Musical Romantic from Minsk Region to the 200th anniversary of his birth
Works by Stanislaw Moniuszko on the Belarusian stage

1819 births
1872 deaths
People from Chervyen District
People from Igumensky Uyezd
Belarusian composers
Male conductors (music)
Male opera composers
Male classical organists
Polish classical organists
Polish conductors (music)
Polish male classical composers
Polish opera composers
Polish people of Armenian descent
Polish Romantic composers
19th-century classical composers
19th-century conductors (music)
19th-century organists
Academic staff of the Chopin University of Music
Burials at Powązki Cemetery